Joshua Jonathan Julius Wyse (born 24 March 2001) is a Sierra Leonean swimmer. He competed in the 2020 Summer Olympics.

References

2001 births
Living people
Sportspeople from Freetown
Swimmers at the 2020 Summer Olympics
Sierra Leonean male swimmers
Olympic swimmers of Sierra Leone
Swimmers at the 2018 Summer Youth Olympics
African Games competitors for Sierra Leone
Swimmers at the 2019 African Games
Sierra Leone Creole people
Swimmers at the 2022 Commonwealth Games
Commonwealth Games competitors for Sierra Leone